
Gmina Hyżne is a rural gmina (administrative district) in Rzeszów County, Subcarpathian Voivodeship, in south-eastern Poland.

Villages
Gmina Hyżne contains the villages and settlements of Brzezówka, Dylągówka, Grzegorzówka, Hyżne, Nieborów, Szklary and Wólka Hyżneńska.

Neighbouring gminas
Gmina Hyżne is bordered by the gminas of Błażowa, Chmielnik, Dynów, Jawornik Polski, Markowa and Tyczyn.

References
Polish official population figures 2006

Hyzne
Rzeszów County